Consumer Ultra-Low Voltage (CULV) is a computing platform developed by Intel. It was estimated in January 2009 that this market could reach 10 million CULV laptops shipped during that year. Competing platforms are the VIA Nano, AMD Yukon, AMD Nile notebook platform, and graphic chips from the Nvidia GeForce line within the "Nvidia Ion platform". Some of the lowest-power-consumption processors for the ultra thin CULV category are only a few watts more than the Intel Atom, which is rated at no more than 2.5 W. Because of their low power and heat output, CULV enables very thin computer systems, and long battery life in notebook computers, such as those designed to Intel's Ultrabook specifications.

While the first processors in this category were single core (such as the SU3500), newer CULV processors are dual core (e.g., the SU9600). They are all based on the Intel Core 2 architecture, but the ultra-low voltage versions have a thermal rating of 5.5 W – more than the Intel Atom, but a fraction of the dual-core mainstream Intel mobile chips rated at 25 and 35 watts – and they come in a small 22 mm chip package.

The newest CULV processors come from the Intel Core product lines, and are based on a 10 nm process.

Processors

Based on the Penryn microarchitecture

Single-Core Processors (45 nm)

Dual-Core Processors (45 nm)

Based on the Westmere microarchitecture

Celeron (32 nm)

Pentium (32 nm)

Core i3 (32 nm)

Core i5 (32 nm)

Core i7 (32 nm)

Based on the Sandy Bridge microarchitecture

Celeron (32 nm)

Pentium (32 nm)

Core i3 (32 nm)

Core i5 (32 nm)

Core i7 (32 nm)

Based on the Ivy Bridge microarchitecture

Celeron (22 nm)

Pentium (22 nm)

Core i3 (22 nm)

Core i5 (22 nm)

Core i7 (22 nm)

Based on the Haswell microarchitecture

Celeron (22 nm)

Pentium (22 nm)

Core i3 (22 nm)

Core i5 (22 nm)

Core i7 (22 nm)

Based on the Broadwell microarchitecture

Celeron (14 nm)

Pentium (14 nm)

Core i3 (14 nm)

Core i5 (14 nm)

Core i7 (14 nm)

Core M (14 nm)

Based on the Skylake microarchitecture

Pentium (14 nm)

Core i3 (14 nm)

Core i5 (14 nm)

Core i7 (14 nm)

Core m (14 nm)

Based on the Kaby Lake microarchitecture

Core i3 (14 nm)

Core i5 (14 nm)

Core i7 (14 nm)

Core m (14 nm)

See also
 List of AMD mobile microprocessors
 List of Intel Celeron microprocessors
 List of Intel Core 2 microprocessors
 List of Intel Core i3 microprocessors
 List of Intel Core i5 microprocessors
 List of Intel Core i7 microprocessors
 List of Intel Pentium microprocessors
 Penryn (microprocessor)
 Ultra-low-voltage processor

References

External links
 Intel - Ultra Thin Laptops

2009 introductions
Intel x86 microprocessors